Geophilus carpophagus is a species of soil centipede in the family Geophilidae, widely considered to be a type species of the genus Geophilus (along with G. electricus). It grows up to 60 millimeters in length, with an orange/tan body bearing a distinctive purplish marbled pattern (also seen in Henia vesuviana). Males of this species have 51 to 55 pairs of legs; females have 53 to 57.

Taxonomy
Recent studies indicate that G. carpophagus is actually a group of closely related species (dubbed the carpophagus species-complex). So far only three species have been clearly defined; G. carpophagus (Leach, 1814), G. easoni (Arthur, et al., 2001) from Europe, and G. arenarius (Meinert, 1870) from North Africa.

Habitat
Geophilus carpophagus is most commonly found across south-east England, though specimens have also been found in mainland Europe, North Africa, and the Canarie islands, with a viable population discovered in Finland in 2018. In the north of England it becomes entirely coastal, where it can be found in cliff sites above the high tide mark. Away from the coast it is usually found living 1 meter or more above the ground in rocks, walls, buildings, and trees. G. carpophagus seemingly has stronger adhesive abilities than G. easoni, presumably to help with climbing. G. carpophagus nests in drier sites than most other British geophilomorphans, which may be connected to its reduced size and number of coxal pores compared to G. easoni.

Behavior
Geophilus carpophagus has a less aggressive defense response than G. easoni (recoiling instead of rearing and bearing poison claws). In laboratory cultures, mothers that were deliberately disturbed and left their brood would return to coil around it again, a behavior that has never been in observed in any other geophilomorph species.

References

carpophagus
Myriapods of Europe
Animals described in 1815
Taxa named by William Elford Leach